The following is a list of events affecting Philippine television in 2019. Events listed include television show debuts, finales, cancellations, and channel launches, closures and rebrandings, as well as information about controversies and carriage disputes.

Events

January
 January 1:
 ABS-CBN Corporation extends the free trial broadcasts of additional digital terrestrial television channels available exclusively on ABS-CBN TV Plus, such as Asianovela Channel, Movie Central, Myx, Jeepney TV and O Shopping.
 MTVph was officially closed and it was switched back to MTV Asia.
 After 1 year of carriage disputes, both Solar Entertainment Corporation channels Jack TV and Solar Sports were returned to Sky Cable. Meanwhile, Basketball TV and NBA Premium TV were also returned to Sky Cable, Sky Direct and Sky On Demand as immediately after 2 months of their disputes.
 Sky Cable terminated GNN on its line-up due to being unable to agree on both sides for the renewal terms on its channel carriage.
 January 4 – After nearly 7 months of preparation and conducting its test broadcast on major cable and satellite providers, RJTV officially started its broadcast on digital terrestrial television with its first two subchannels namely, "RJTV" and "Oras ng Himala" of Jesus is our Shield Worldwide Ministries. It was initially set to launch on July 15, 2018, but delayed to the 1st quarter of 2019, the network plans to accommodate six and 1seg digital channels that will air local & foreign content and considering launch its two "Teleradyo" style subchannels for sister stations Radyo Bandido 810 AM and RJ 100.3 FM.
 January 9 – After 6 years and 10 months, Hyper was rebranded as One Sports, the relaunch of international and localized sports channel in partnership with MVP-owned media properties 5 and ESPN5. WWE Smackdown was the first program aired on the newly rebranded channel.
 January 12 – After 7 years of broadcast, AksyonTV ended its commercial operations on Saturday evening
 January 13 – 5 gets a new refreshed logo and along with its sister network, AksyonTV officially relaunched as 5 Plus. 5 Plus's programs now airs additional sports content and sports-related programs targeted at millennials; it also serves as a competitor to ABS-CBN's S+A, which also carries the same format. All of Radyo5 simulcast programs moved to the newly launched stand-alone satellite channel under test broadcast, exclusively on pay TV satellite service, Cignal.
 January 24 – ABS-CBN Corporation quietly sold 49% of AMCARA Broadcasting Network to one of the majority shareholders, Rodrigo V. Carandang.

February
 February 1:
 Cignal celebrated its 10th anniversary.
 After 10 years of broadcasting, GNN was rebranded as One Media Network.
 February 18 – After 1 month and 5 days of test broadcast, the Radyo5 simulcast channel initially metamorphosed as One PH exclusively on Cignal, a pay TV satellite service. It will be second news channel of the pay satellite service following the launching of the English news channel One News in 2018 and the third channel to use the "One" branding following the rebranding of the sports channel Hyper to One Sports in the previous month.
 February 23 – Mitch Montecarlo Suasane was hailed as the Miss Q & A InterTALAKtic 2019 on It's Showtime. It was held at Smart Araneta Coliseum.

March
 March 1 – ABS-CBN Corporation extends again for the second time for the free trial broadcasts of additional digital terrestrial television channels available exclusively on ABS-CBN TV Plus, such as Asianovela Channel, Movie Central, Myx, Jeepney TV and O Shopping.
 March 29 – Converge ICT launched its own mobile streaming service, Converge Freedom.
 March 30 – Echo Calingal was proclaimed as BakClash grand winner on Eat Bulaga!.

April
 April 3 − Derek Ramsay transferred and returned to GMA Network.
 April 7 – The FCPC Baliktanaw was named the grand winner of the first season of World of Dance Philippines.
 April 14 – TAP Sports 1 and TAP Sports 2 were launched by TAP Digital Media Ventures Corporation, exclusively on Sky Cable.
 April 21 − Knowledge Channel moved their channel to DTV Channel 2.01 from DTV Channel 1.05 and began its test broadcast after 4 years as an encrypted channel exclusively on ABS-CBN TV Plus for Mega Manila, Metro Cebu and Cagayan de Oro only.
 April 24 − After 14 years, GMA Network's subsidiary Citynet Network Marketing and Productions and ZOE Broadcasting Network announced a termination of its blocktime deal for airing GMA-produced programs on ZOE's owned Channel 11 effective June 3 as GMA-owned TV network, GMA News TV (which broadcast on its said channel frequency) will transferred to Citynet's owned Channel 27 the following day.

May
 May 13–14 – All Philippine TV networks had its special coverage of the 2019 elections.
 May 15 – GMA Network's digital broadcast transferred to its permanent frequency on Channel 15 from Channel 27, following the termination of blocktime deal between GMA and ZOE on April 24, as the former frequency will used by GMA News TV from its current frequency on Channel 11 beginning on June 4.
 May 19 – Anton Fausto, Dani Mortel, and Aya Fernandez were named as the new MYX VJs at the end of Myx VJ Search 2019.
 May 23 – The Philippines' female-oriented TV channel, ETC celebrates on its 15th year on free-to-air television.
 May 24 – ABS-CBN continued to celebrate its 65th anniversary of Philippine television. Kapamilya stars, personalities, and employees past and present show support for the network and greeted the anniversary.
 May 31 – Eat Bulaga! introduced their new segment It is based from the Slippery Stairs game from Japan which is a franchise and adaptation, Rush 4 Win Philippines: Slippery Stairs: produced by Tokyo Broadcasting System.

June
 June 1:
 ABS-CBN Corporation extends again for the third time for the free trial broadcasts of additional digital terrestrial television channels available exclusively on ABS-CBN TV Plus, such as Asianovela Channel, Movie Central, Myx, Jeepney TV and O Shopping.
 ABS-CBN launched "ABS-CBN TV Plus Go", a digital TV dongle for Android smartphones.
 June 3 – Head coach Chot Reyes was replaced by Jane Basas as the new president and CEO of TV5 Network, Inc.
 June 4 – After 8 years of broadcasting on Channel 11, GMA News TV transferred to Channel 27 (which also serves as the stations return on-air in the analog after 18 years of hibernation) due to GMA/Citynet's termination of blocktime agreement with ZOE Broadcasting Network. Their digital broadcast on the other hand will move to UHF Channel 15 to continue its digital test broadcast. A one-day extension had been made to midnight is allowing channel 11 viewers to carry news coverage related to the first day of classes in public schools in the country, averting a June 2 deadline.
 June 12 – The Philippines' leading Pinoy movie pay TV channel, Cinema One marks on its 25th year on cable television.
 June 29 – GMA Network, Inc. plans a new partnership with over-the-top (OTT) digital streaming service Jungo TV to launch the company's networks Front Row Channel and Hallypop to the market; the Philippine launch of Jungo TV's channels will be launched at the later date. It will marked the company's second joint partnership with other media companies in other markets. (GMA already handles programming output content to Fox Filipino, which is owned by Walt Disney Direct-to-Consumer & International from its 2012 launch as joint programming output content partner with rival TV5 Network, Inc. until the former assuming the exclusive programming output content partner beginning in 2015).

July
 July 1 – K Movies Pinoy was officially launched of the 24/7 Filipino-dubbed Korean movie pay TV channel in the Philippines. 
 July 18 - A bill extending the franchise granted to TV5 Network, Inc. has lapsed into law after President Rodrigo Duterte failed to act on the measure. TV5 Network, Inc., a subsidiary of MediaQuest Holdings under PLDT Beneficial Trust Fund that carries The 5 Network, granted an amendment of its congressional franchise under Republic Act No. 11320 (which previously Republic Act No. 7831), allowing TV5 to operate radio and television stations nationwide.
 July 28 – Zephanie Dimaranan won the first season of Idol Philippines held at the Newport Performing Arts Theater, Resorts World Manila.
 July 30 – Eat Bulaga!, the longest-running noontime show, celebrated its 40th year in Philippine television.
 July 31 – After 5 months and 13 days of initial and soft broadcast, One PH formally launched its official broadcast by Cignal TV being categorized into three blocks: NewsKom (News Komentaryo; newscasts and talk shows), KKK (Katarungan, Karapatan at Kaalaman; public service and infotainment) and SnS (Showbiz and Sports).

August
 August 4:
 After 14 years of airing, Goin' Bulilit was ended.
 Yamyam Gucong of Bohol was hailed as the Pinoy Big Brother: Otso Ultim8 Big Winner held at the AATF Sports Complex in Imus, Cavite.
 August 8 – FPJ's Ang Probinsyano celebrated its record-breaking 1,000th episode on television. 
 August 9 – Tonight with Boy Abunda celebrated its record-breaking 1,000th episode on television.
 August 10 – Jin Macapagal of Cebu City was hailed as the Ultimate BidaMan of It's Showtime's BidaMan: The Big Break held at the New Frontier Theater, Quezon City, Metro Manila.
 August 19 – Most of UNTV's programs started to broadcast in full high definition after years of broadcasting in standard definition format.

September
 September 1 – ABS-CBN Corporation extends again for the fourth time for the free trial broadcasts of additional digital terrestrial television channels available exclusively on ABS-CBN TV Plus, such as Asianovela Channel, Movie Central, Myx, Jeepney TV and O Shopping.
 September 12 – After 27 years of broadcast, SBN shuts down in analog signal. It became the fifth broadcaster to completely switch off its analog transmission.
 September 15 – Kim de Leon and Shayne Sava of StarStruck hailed as the Ultimate Male and Female Survivors.
 September 16 – DZRJ 810 TeleRadyo officially launched, a digital terrestrial and cable service. All of DZRJ 810 AM simulcast programs are newly launched stand-alone digital and cable channel under test broadcast on RJdigiTV sub-channel, and it is also available via SkyCable Channel 224 in Metro Manila.
 September 24 – The Filipino Channel celebrated its 25th anniversary on global television.
 September 25 – ABS-CBN Corporation jointly ventured with American production company, Electric Entertainment for producing an upcoming American TV series to be filmed entirely in the Philippines.
 September 28:
 Since 2015, FPJ's Ang Probinsyano celebrated its 4th anniversary on television.
 Elaine Duran from Butuan was hailed as It's Showtime's Tawag ng Tanghalan Year 3 Grand Champion. It was held at Caloocan Sports Complex, Bagumbong, Caloocan.
 September 30 – Easy TV Home, a freemium digital TV subscription service, has ceased its commercial operations while only with free-to-air programming channels will continue after that date.

October
 October 1 – After a long years of broadcast coverage, Solar Entertainment Corporation has ceased broadcast of the following channels Basketball TV and NBA Premium TV as the contract with the National Basketball Association expires on that date. ABS-CBN Sports and Fox Sports announced also that will terminating their contracts with the association after 8 years of broadcasts. After the closure of both networks and the expiration of the Solar/ABS-CBN/FNG contracts, the NBA announced that some games during the 2019–20 season will be streaming live on Facebook and Twitter while the TV broadcast deal is still on hold. Later in November, the NBA has announced that the Nine Media Corporation will assumed the free-to-air television rights for these games during the regular season thru CNN Philippines (which the network's license holder WarnerMedia News & Sports held the U.S. cable rights to the NBA); marking the return of the NBA on channel 9 since the 2010–11 season. Other BTV programs (including the National Basketball League, the Women's National Basketball League, and Liga ACB) will be migrated to Solar Sports except for the EuroLeague which has been transferred to TAP Sports 1.
 October 1–31 – It's Showtime, ABS-CBN's hit noontime variety show, will celebrate its 10th year in Philippine television dubbed as "Sampu-sample". The program relaunched the classic Showtime format, Sine Mo ‘To, Ansabe and AdVice Ganda.
 October 2 – A massive fire occur inside the Star City theme park in Pasay, where it affected the offices of Manila Broadcasting Company which the radio stations disrupting its regular programming and knocking DZRH News Television (and its radio counterpart) off-the-air which the television viewers lost the channel for cable and satellite providers. Meanwhile, the FM stations and Radyo Natin broadcasts were moved to the alternate studio.
 October 5 - Eat Bulaga! held a world record in the segment Bawal Kumurap Nakamamatay Ng Swerte!, wherein Dabarkads Paolo Ballesteros didn't blink his eye for 1 hour, 17 minutes and 3 seconds, making it as a world record for a Philippine television program.
 October 8 - Since 2018, Kadenang Ginto celebrated its first anniversary on television.
 October 13 - "Mabagal", a song entry composed by Dan Martel Simon Tañedo and interpreted by Daniel Padilla and Moira Dela Torre was named as Himig Handog 2019 grand winner held at ABS-CBN. This was aired on ABS-CBN's "ASAP Natin 'To".
 October 15: 
 After 1 month of test broadcast, the DZRJ 810 AM simulcast channel officially metamorphosed as DZRJ 810 RadioVision available in all cable and digital providers, a cable TV and digital service. It will be first news channel of the pay cable and digital service following the launching of the religious channel Oras ng Himala Channel in 2018 and the third channel to use following the launching of the music channel Rock of Manila TV in the previous month.
 Rock of Manila TV was officially soft launched on all cable TV and Digital providers in the Philippines. It is owned by the Rajah Broadcasting Network.
 October 24 – It's Showtime celebrated its 10th year in Philippine television.
 October 26:
 Nicole Borromeo (from Cebu) was crowned as Miss Millennial Philippines 2019 of the noontime show, Eat Bulaga! held at the Meralco Theater.
 J-Crisis (from Sampaloc, Manila) was hailed as the Classic Showtime 10th Anniversary Grand Champion of the noontime show, It's Showtime held at the Newport Performing Arts Theater, Resorts World Manila.
 Team Vice with Miss Q and A Queens was hailed as Magpasikat 2019 Grand Champion of the noontime show, It's Showtime held at Newport Performing Arts Theater, Resorts World Manila.

November
 November 1 – Apple TV+, a streaming service owned by Apple Inc., was launched and became available in the Philippines, alongside in about 100 countries.
 November 3 – Vanjoss Bayaban, coached by Sarah Geronimo, won the fourth season of The Voice Kids, the grand finals of which were held at the Newport Performing Arts Theater, Resorts World Manila.
 November 6 – Knowledge Channel celebrates on its 20th year on free-to-air and pay digital television with the theme, "Ang Saya Matuto!".
 November 7 – Kapuso Mo, Jessica Soho celebrated its 15th year in Philippine television.
 November 9 – Ethel Booba from General Santos emerged as the first-ever Tawag ng Tanghalan Celebrity Grand Champion.
 November 23 – Paul Maawa of Lucena, Quezon emerged as Mister Q & A 2019.
 November 30 – December 11 – All Philippine TV networks had its special coverage of the 2019 Southeast Asian Games.

December
 December 1 – ABS-CBN Corporation extends again for the fifth time for the free trial broadcasts of additional digital terrestrial television channels available exclusively on ABS-CBN TV Plus, such as Asianovela Channel, Movie Central, Myx, Jeepney TV and O Shopping.
 December 3 – HBO Go, a video-on-demand streaming service owned by Home Box Office, Inc. (operated as a unit of WarnerMedia), was launched and became available in the Philippines.
 December 6 - Since 1999, Unang Hirit celebrates on its 20th year of long-running morning newscast show on Philippine television.
 December 15 – Jeremiah Tiangco won the second season of The Clash.
 December 21 – Mark Michael Garcia from Malabon emerged as the first-ever TNT All-Star Grand Resbak Champion.

Unknown (dates)
 August – iQiYi, an online video platform owned by Baidu, was expanded its service worldwide including the Philippines.
 August–October – ABS-CBN launches the Kapamilya Love Weekend, a special public service event held in 65 barangays (villages) all over the Philippines. The Kapamilya Love Weekend is a combination of various public services, such as DZMM Kapamilya Day (Metro Manila and Luzon), ABS-CBN TLC (Teaching, Learning and Caring) (Metro Manila and Luzon), ABS-CBN Handog sa Kapamilya (North Luzon), ABS-CBN Grand Halad sa Kapamilya (Cebu), ABS-CBN Serbisyo Patrol (Davao), and Barangay Kapamilya (various areas) with various Kapamilya stars, DZMM anchors, and local personalities. It is organized by the network, in cooperation with ABS-CBN Foundation, ABS-CBN News and ABS-CBN Regional, as it continues to celebrate its 65th year in Philippine television.
 POP TV Pte. Ltd. launched a mass market video-on-demand service, "POPTV", and began its soft operations which include a wide variety of library contents from the local entertainment, as well as Tagalized versions of an international hits.
 TAP Digital Media Ventures Corporation launched "TAP Go", an over-the-top content and video-on-demand platform that carried some programming contents from movies, shows and sports, as well as livestreaming of its owned TV channels.

Debuts

ABS-CBN

The following are programs that debuted on ABS-CBN:

Re-runs
 July 14: Superbook Reimagined (season 4)
 July 20: Honey, Watch Out!

Notes
^  Originally aired on Yey!

GMA

The following are programs that debuted on GMA Network:

Re-runs

Notes
^  Originally aired on ABS-CBN 
^  Originally aired on 5 
^  Originally aired on Q (now GMA News TV) 
^  Originally aired on 9TV (now CNN Philippines)

5 (The 5 Network)

The following are programs that debuted on 5:

Re-runs

PTV

The following are programs that debuted on People's Television Network:

IBC

The following are programs that debuted on IBC:

Other channels
The following are programs that debuted on other minor channels and video streaming services:

Re-runs

 Notes
^  Originally aired on ABS-CBN
^  Originally aired on GMA
^  Originally aired on 5
^  Originally aired on Cine Mo!
^  Originally aired on Yey!
^  Originally aired on S+A
^  Originally aired on Jeepney TV
^  Originally aired on Sari-Sari Channel
^  Originally aired on Hero (now defunct)
^  Originally aired on ETC
^  Originally aired on Jack TV
^  Originally aired on 2nd Avenue (now defunct)
^  Originally aired on CT (now defunct)
^  Originally aired on Studio 23 (now S+A)
^  Originally aired on Q (now GMA News TV)
^  Originally aired on 9TV (now CNN Philippines)

Returning or renamed programs

Major networks

Other channels

Programs transferring networks

Major networks

Other channels

Milestone episodes

The following shows made their Milestone episodes in 2019:

Finales

ABS-CBN

The following are programs that ended on ABS-CBN:

Stopped airing

GMA

The following are programs that ended on GMA Network:

Stopped airing
 November 24: The Atom Araullo Specials (reason: Program on series break. The program resumed on May 31, 2020.)

5 (The 5 Network)

The following are programs that ended on 5:

Stopped airing

PTV

The following are programs that ended on People's Television Network:

Stopped airing
 July 27: PCSO Lottery Draw (reason: temporary suspension of all PCSO lottery games due to alleged "massive" corruption. The program resumed on July 31.)

IBC

The following are programs that ended on IBC:
 February 11: News Team 13
 February 23: Chicken Talk
 March 3: Family TV Mass
 April 26: Bukas May Kahapon
 May 5: Mula sa Edukador
 May 9: OOTD: Opisyal of the Day
 May 31: My Ultimate Modelo 2019
 October 13: Kaibigan Special Sunday
 December 28: Artista Teen Quest 2019 and Pare Kuys
 December 29: SMAC Pinoy Ito!

Stopped airing
 July 19: Retro TV, Hapi House!, Sic O'Clock News and T.O.D.A.S. (reason: Series break)

Other channels

Unknown (dates)
 Chinatown TV on Net 25

Stopped airing

Networks

The following are a list of free-to-air and cable channels or networks launches and closures in 2019.

Launches

Stations changing network affiliation
The following is a list of television stations that have made or will make noteworthy affiliation switches in 2019.

Rebranded
The following is a list of television stations or cable channels that have made or will make noteworthy network rebrands in 2019.

Closures

Stopped broadcasting
The following are a list of stations and channels or networks that have stopped broadcasting or (temporarily) off the air in 2019.

Awards
 July 23: 27th KBP Golden Dove Awards, organized by the Kapisanan ng mga Brodkaster ng Pilipinas
 October 13: 33rd PMPC Star Awards for Television, organized by Philippine Movie Press Club

Deaths

February
 February 9 – Bentong (b. 1964), actor and comedian
 February 11 – Armida Siguion-Reyna (b. 1930), actress
 February 23 – Kristoffer King (b. 1982), actor

March
 March 8 - Boyong Baytion, (b. 1953), comedian and assistant director (Palibhasa Lalake, Abangan Ang Susunod Na Kabanata, Ang TV and Home Along Da Riles)
 March 9 – Chokoleit, (b. 1970), TV host, actor, and comedian
 March 13 – Maria "Bulaklak" Ausente, (b. 1989), former TV Patrol Panay and GMA News correspondent
 March 18 - Augusto Victa, (b. 1931), former TV and radio drama actor.

April
 April 1 - Joseph Ubalde, (b. 1986), former News5 weather anchor; and contributor and researcher of VERA Files 

May
 May 31 – Gary Lising, (b. 1942), former comedian.

June
 June 20 – Eddie Garcia, (b. 1929), actor and film director.

July
 July 8 – Chito Arceo, (b. 1949), former actor and television sales executive.

August
 August 19 - Gina Lopez, (b. 1953), former Department of Environment and Natural Resources secretary, chairperson, managing director and TV producer of ABS-CBN Foundation and host of G Diaries.
 August 25 - Mona Lisa, (b. 1922), actress.

September
 September 8 - Lito Legaspi, (b. 1942), actor.

October
 October 5 - Amalia Fuentes, (b. 1940), actress.
 October 8 - Carlos Celdran, (b. 1972), cultural activist and performance artist.

December
 December 9 - Miko Palanca, (b. 1978), actor.
 December 13 - Cesar Apolinario, (b. 1973), GMA News reporter and host of iJuander.

See also
2019 in television

References

 
Television in the Philippines by year
Philippine television-related lists